Ines Bibernell (née Obst; born July 21, 1965 in Querfurt, Bezirk Halle) is a former East German female track and field athlete who competed in middle- and long-distance track events. She was a gold medallist at the European Athletics Indoor Championships in 1986.

A member of the SC Chemie Halle athletics club, the Querfurt-born athlete came to prominence in the 1985 season. The teenager won a 1500 metres/3000 metres double at the East German Indoor Championships before going on to take a 3000 m/10,000 metres double at the East German Athletics Championships outdoors. Her first major international appearances came that year in the 10,000 m and she was runner-up at the 1985 European Cup and placed fourth at the 1985 IAAF World Cup.

At the start of 1986, she defended her national indoor title over 3000 m and set an under-23 indoor world best for the 2-mile run, finishing in a time of 9:34.27 minutes in New York City. This remains the German national record for that event. The greatest feat of her career came that February, as she won the gold medal over 3000 m at the 1986 European Athletics Indoor Championships – the only East German woman ever to win that title. After this victory she won a 1500/3000 m double at the national outdoor championships. A third straight East German indoor 3000 m title came in 1987, but this was the last high level achievement of her briefly flourishing career.

Personal bests
 800 metres: 2:05.4 min, 9 June 1983, Neubrandenburg 
 1500 metres: 4:05.64 min, 28 June 1985, Potsdam 
 2000 metres: 5:47.58 min, 22 September 1985, East Berlin
 3000 metres: 8:49.80 min, 27 June 1986, Jena  
 5000 metres: 15:27.05 min, 3 July 1986, Dresden
 10,000 metres: 32:32.28 min, 1 June 1986, Erfurt

International competitions

National titles
East German Athletics Championships
1500 m: 1986
3000 m: 1985, 1986
10,000 m: 1985
East German Indoor Athletics Championships
1500 m: 1985
3000 m: 1985, 1986, 1987

See also

List of European Athletics Indoor Championships medalists (women)

References

External links

1965 births
Living people
People from Querfurt
People from Bezirk Halle
East German female middle-distance runners
East German female long-distance runners
German female middle-distance runners
German female long-distance runners
Sportspeople from Saxony-Anhalt
SC Chemie Halle athletes